Luciano Ospina (born February 18, 1991) is a Colombian footballer who currently plays for Millonarios on loan from Alianza Petrolera. He was a member of the Colombia national under-20 football team at the 2011 Sub 20 World Cup.

External links
 Profile at BDFA 
 

1991 births
Living people
Colombian footballers
Colombia under-20 international footballers
Colombian expatriate footballers
Categoría Primera A players
Categoría Primera B players
Argentine Primera División players
Club Atlético Huracán footballers
FC UTA Arad players
América de Cali footballers
Envigado F.C. players
Boyacá Chicó F.C. footballers
Fortaleza C.E.I.F. footballers
Alianza Petrolera players
Millonarios F.C. players
Footballers from Medellín
Association football defenders
Colombian expatriate sportspeople in Argentina
Colombian expatriate sportspeople in Romania
Expatriate footballers in Argentina
Expatriate footballers in Romania